Yelling Fire in an Empty Theater is an American comedy-drama independent film written and directed by Justin Zuckerman. It premiered at the 2022 Slamdance Film Festival, and was released on Fandor on January 24, 2023.

Plot
The film follows Lisa, a recent college graduate, who moves from Florida to New York, into an apartment with an often-bickering couple, meeting new friends and experiencing the city.

Cast
 Isadora Leiva as Lisa
 Kelly Cooper as Holly
 Michael Patrick Nicholson as Bill
 Ryan Martin Brown as Eric
 Austin Cassel as Sean
 Colin Burgess as Doug
 Krista Jensen as Debra

Production
The film was produced by Ryan Martin Brown and 5th Floor Pictures. It was filmed on a mini-DV camcorder on a very small budget. Director Justin Zuckerman said he likes the playful aesthetic and look of mini-DV.

Release
The film premiered at the Slamdance Film Festival on January 27, 2022, where it was nominated for Best Narrative Feature. It won the Audience Choice Award for Best Feature at the 2022 Tallahassee Film Festival. On January 18, 2023, Cinedigm announced that it had acquired the North American rights to the film, and that it would be released on Cinedigm's streaming platform Fandor starting on January 24, 2023.

References

External links 
 

2022 comedy-drama films
2020s American films
2020s English-language films
2022 independent films
American independent films